USS Assertive is a name used more than once by the U.S. Navy:

 , a coastal minesweeper laid down on 5 April 1941.
 , launched on 20 June 1986, built for MSTS.

References 
 

United States Navy ship names